Jord Engineers India is a public limited company incorporated in 1989 and listed on the Bombay Stock Exchange. It is based in Asoj, Gujarat and manufactures heat exchangers and finned tubes.

References

External links
 

Engineering companies of India